A concordat is an agreement between the Holy See and a national government. Concordat may also refer to:
 Memorandum of understanding, especially between the central UK government and the devolved Scottish and Welsh administrations
 Concordat of 1801, the reconciliation between Napoleon and the Catholic Church 
 Concordat of 2002 between the national government of Georgia and the Georgian Orthodox Church
 The Concordat, in Funny Farm (webcomic), the name of a secret society